Gregory Dane Brown (born July 2, 1949) is an American folk singer-songwriter and guitarist from Iowa.

Early life
Brown was born into a musical family, and his father was a Pentecostal minister. He grew up in the Hacklebarney region of southwestern Iowa, which he describes as "hill country." Brown spent several years traveling with a band before returning to Iowa, where he performed live and pursued his songwriting career.

Career

During the 1980s Brown toured and had recurring performances on A Prairie Home Companion. Brown self-published two albums, 44 & 66 and The Iowa Waltz. Bob Feldman and Susan Ode founded the record company called Red House Records after producing a sold-out concert at the Guthrie Theater in Minneapolis, Minnesota, in 1990. Brown became its first recording artist. Brown has recorded two dozen albums. In 1986 he released an album called Songs of Innocence and of Experience based on poems by William Blake. His album One Big Town (1989) won an Indie Award from the National Association of Independent Record Distributors and marked the beginning of Brown's long collaboration with Iowa guitarist Bo Ramsey.

The Poet Game (1994), his tenth studio album, saw significant international radio play (charting on AAA and topping The Gavin Report’s Americana chart) and earned not only critical raves, but also a NAIRD Indie award for singer-songwriter Album of the Year. The Live One (1995) proved to be a fan favorite capturing the humor, warmth, insights and spirit of his live shows. His 1996 release, Further In, topped them all: critics called it a masterpiece and it received a four-star review in Rolling Stone. Greg’s 1997 release — Slant 6 Mind — received more of the same and earned Greg his second Grammy nomination.

1999 brought the re-release of One Night, a live concert recording from October 1983 originally released on the Coffeehouse Extempore label. His album Solid Heart CD was recorded in 1999 during a benefit concert. Two releases followed in 2000: Over and Under (Trailer Records) and the critically acclaimed Covenant, which won the Association for Independent Music’s award for Best Contemporary Folk Album of 2000. A 2002 tribute album, Going Driftless: An Artist’s Tribute to Greg Brown featured guest vocal performances by Ani DiFranco, Gillian Welch, Shawn Colvin, and his three daughters.

In 2006 he released The Evening Call, which Acoustic Guitar magazine described as "among Brown's finest work" and which was featured on an episode of NPR's On Point. A recording of another benefit concert was recorded and released in 2007 under the name Yellow Dog on the EarthWorks Music label. In 2007, Brown was nominated for a Folk Alliance Award. In 2010, Brown played Hades on Hadestown, a concept album by Anaïs Mitchell. His most recent studio album, Hymns to What Is Left, was released in 2012.

Personal life
Greg Brown has been married three times. He has one daughter from his first marriage: Pieta Brown; and two from his second marriage: Constance Brown and Zoe Brown—all three are musicians. He has one son. Brown married singer-songwriter Iris DeMent in November 2002. In 2005, he and his wife adopted a daughter from Russia, Daria Chesnokva Victorona (Dasha Brown).

Discography
 Hacklebarney (1974) (with Dick Pinney)
 44 & 66 (1980)
 The Iowa Waltz (1981)
 One Night (1983)
 In the Dark with You (1985)
 Songs of Innocence and of Experience (1986)
 One More Goodnight Kiss (1988)
 One Big Town (1989)
 Down in There (1990)
 Dream Café (1992)
 Friend of Mine (1993) (with Bill Morrissey)
 Bathtub Blues (1993)
 The Poet Game (1994)
 The Live One (1995)
 Further In (1996)
 Slant 6 Mind (1997)
 Solid Heart (1999) (benefit CD)
 Over and Under (2000)
 Covenant (2000)
 Down in the Valley: Barn Aid Benefit Concert (2001)
 Milk of the Moon (2002)
 Live at the Black Sheep (2003)
 If I Had Known: Essential Recordings, 1980-96 (2003)
 Honey in the Lion's Head (2004)
 In the Hills of California (2004)
 The Evening Call (2006)
 Yellow Dog (2007)
 Live from the Big Top (2007)
 Dream City: Essential Recordings, 1997-2006 (2009)
 Freak Flag (2011)
 Hymns to What Is Left (2012)

Tribute albums
 Songs of Greg Brown (Prudence Johnson) (1991)
 Going Driftless: An Artist's Tribute to Greg Brown (Various artists) (2002)
 Seth Avett Sings Greg Brown (Seth Avett) (2022)

Featured on
 Hadestown (Anaïs Mitchell) (2010)

References

External links
Greg Brown fan site
Red House Records

1949 births
Living people
People from Fairfield, Iowa
American folk musicians
American male singer-songwriters
Fast Folk artists
American basses
Red House Records artists
Singer-songwriters from Iowa